Gjorgji Kyçyku Stadium is a stadium in Pogradec, Albania.  It is the home ground of KS Pogradeci.

History

Gjorgji Kyçyku is the stadium where the KS Pogradeci team plays since 1932. Since the establishment there have deployed 5 trophies in Pogradec, 3 of the First Division and 2 of the Second Division.

Matches since 2018

2018-2019 season

2019-20 KS Pogradeci season

Note: For all matches click on KS Pogradeci site on Soccerway.

2019-2020 season

Note: For all matches click on KS Pogradeci site on Soccerway.

References

  KS Pogradeci Venue
  KS Pogradeci Matches

Football venues in Albania
Buildings and structures in Pogradec